Angelo State University is a public university in San Angelo, Texas. It was founded in 1928 as San Angelo College. It gained university status and awarded its first baccalaureate degrees in 1967 and graduate degrees in 1969, the same year it took on its current name. It offers 50 undergraduate programs and 31 graduate programs. It is the second-largest campus in the Texas Tech University System.

History

The history of ASU can be traced to 1928, when San Angelo College was established following a municipal election held in 1926. Organized as part of the city school system, for many years, the two-year college occupied a site on North Oakes Street near the commercial center of the city. The voters of Tom Green County in 1945 created a county junior college district and elected the first board of trustees. In 1947, the first building was constructed on the present university site.

The university has experienced a rapid transition from a regional junior college to an accredited senior institution of higher learning. Pushed through the legislature by State Senator Dorsey B. Hardeman, a former mayor of San Angelo, the former San Angelo College was transformed into Angelo State College in 1965 by an act of the 58th Session of the Texas State Legislature in 1963. The transfer of authority from the Board of Trustees of the junior college to the Board of Regents, State Senior Colleges, became effective on September 1, 1965. In May 1967, the first baccalaureate degrees were awarded. Shortly after Hardeman retired from the Texas Senate, the name of the institution was changed to Angelo State University in May 1969.

The graduate program was initiated in 1970 with the start of the university's College of Graduate Studies. During a major realignment of the Texas University systems, Angelo State University was designated as a member of the Texas State University System in 1975, along with Sam Houston State University, Southwest Texas State University, and Sul Ross State University, when the 64th Texas Legislature changed the name of the governing board to Board of Regents, Texas State University System.

In the fall of 2007, the Alumni Association voted to request a move to the Texas Tech University System from the Texas State University System.
The merger received widespread support in San Angelo and Lubbock, where Texas Tech University is located. The bill was approved, signed by Gov. Rick Perry, and voted into the Texas Constitution by the electorate, making Angelo State University accountable to the Texas Tech System Board of Regents in late 2007.

The first doctoral program, the doctorate of physical therapy through the College of Nursing and Allied Health, was offered in 2009.

Angelo State completed its first capital campaign in 2013, raising $35 million for facility construction, scholarships, and academic support. After reaching the original goal of $25 million in the first 15 months of the campaign, the goal was raised to $35 million, which was reached in June 2013.

Academics

Angelo State's students come from all across Texas with an additional 46 states and 22 other countries also represented in the university's total enrollment. The university is accredited by the Southern Association of Colleges and Schools.
 
Of the over 3,000 universities nationwide, Angelo State University ranked 85th in endowment funds per student. The interest earned from the endowment goes towards scholarships and academic support.

Angelo State University offers 35 minor programs, 50 bachelor's, 31 master's, and one doctoral degree program. The graduate school at Angelo State was authorized by the Board of Regents, State Senior Colleges, on May 15, 1970, and approved by The Texas Higher Education Coordinating Board on October 19, 1970. In 2009, the university was authorized by the Texas Higher Education Coordinating Board to offer doctoral level degrees, starting with a doctorate in physical therapy.

Angelo State University is divided into six colleges, including the Norris-Vincent College of Business, College of Education, College of Arts and Humanities, Archer College of Health and Human Services, College of Science and Engineering, and College of Graduate Studies and Research.

Rankings
U.S. News & World Report ranked Angelo State's online graduate education program 36th in the nation and its Graduate Degree in Nursing ranked 39th in the nation in its 2016 Best Colleges report.

US Veterans magazine ranked Angelo State University as a "Best of the Best" in its 2015 listing of top veteran-friendly schools.

SourceMedia and its magazine On Wall Street named Angelo State University one of the nation's "75 Leading Schools for Financial Planners" for 2016.

The Chronicle of Higher Education named Angelo State University one of the nation's "Great Colleges to Work For" for 2018. ASU was one of only 84 institutions of higher education recognized nationally by The Chronicle, and also ranked highly enough to be one of only 42 institutions named to their 2018 Honor Roll. The 2018 recognition marks the fourth straight year ASU was made both the "Great Colleges to Work For" list and the Honor Roll.

Campus

It is centered on the campus mall, a tree-lined pedestrian walkway that covers over 1 mile (1.6 km) and connects most major buildings. It has changed significantly since 1965 as a result of the development of an ultramodern physical plant now valued at over $450 million. The university consists of over 60 buildings encompassing  of available space.

Major academic buildings include the Porter Henderson Library, which was completed in the fall of 1967, and the Raymond M. Cavness Science Building, which was opened in the spring of 1968. An academic building and a 10-story women's high-rise residence hall and accompanying food-service center were opened in September 1968. A second 10-story residence hall for men opened in September 1969. The modernization and expansion of the Houston Harte University Center was completed during the summer of 1971, and a physical education complex was opened in the summer of 1972.

The Robert and Nona Carr Education-Fine Arts Building, completed during the spring of 1976, provides ultramodern facilities for the Departments of Education, Art and Music, and Communications, Drama, and Journalism. In addition to an extensive array of teaching facilities, many special-use areas are incorporated in the building, including the theater, recital hall, and band hall, and an area for art design and ceramics. The 60,000-sq-ft (5,600 m) Emil C. Rassman Building, completed during the summer of 1983, houses the Department of Business Administration, the Department of Accounting, Economics, and Finance, and Department of Aerospace Studies, as well as the office of the Dean of the College of Professional Studies.

The Lloyd D. and Johnell S. Vincent Nursing-Physical Science Building was completed during the spring semester of 1985. Located across the mall from the Physical Education Building and the Emil C. Rassman Building, the building contains about 73,000 sq ft (6,800 m) arranged over two floors. The building houses the university's nursing program, the Physics and Geosciences Department, and offices for the Dean of the College of Sciences and the Dean of the Graduate School. Specialized teaching and laboratory facilities are included for physics, physical science, geology, and nursing. The building houses one of the largest planetariums among the nation's colleges and universities, featuring a 50-ft (15 m) dome and seating for 114. The facility is used as a lecture hall and for other special programs. It is also used in conjunction with academic courses in astronomy and for public shows.
The 86,000-sq-ft (8,000 m) Mathematics-Computer Science Building, completed in 1996, houses the Department of Mathematics and the Department of Computer Science, as well as facilities to support the university's mainframe computing services. Other recent additions include expansion of the Cavness Science Building, construction of the new Texan Hall residences, and adding another floor to the Porter Henderson Library to accommodate the Communications, Drama, and Journalism Department and Honors Program.
The Management Instruction and Research Center is a  ranch on O.C. Fisher Lake property, which Angelo State has under long-term lease from the US Corps of Engineers. These facilities support the programs in animal science and biology and a wide range of management and research activities.

Safety and security

Sixteen emergency call boxes are strategically spread across campus. In the case of an emergency and the need for immediate assistance, all calls are routed directly to the Angelo State Police Department. In addition Angelo State has a "Lifeline App" for IPhone or Android made available free of charge. It can be used for distress calls or with use of a hands-free timer that will send for help if not deactivated. GPS location can be used to instantly send ASU Police to that location. The Angelo State University Police Department employs 14 full-time police officers, all certified state peace officers, with the same qualifications and powers that municipal police departments deploy. They patrol the campus 24 hours/day, 365 days/year. The ASU alert system sends out messages to all campus emails and cell phones registered through the system in the case of any campus or regional emergency.

Student life

In accordance with its mission as a residential campus, over 100 student organizations play an important role in the social scene at Angelo State. Some of these include national Greek fraternities and sororities, such as Lambda Chi Alpha, Kappa Sigma, Alpha Sigma Phi, Pi Kappa Alpha, Alpha Phi Omega, Kappa Delta Rho, Delta Sigma Pi, Delta Zeta, and Sigma Kappa, as well as numerous academic and professional organizations, boards and councils, honor societies, religious organizations, special interest organizations, and intramural sports.

The Houston Harte University Center serves students' recreational and community needs. For student recreation, it offers multiple pool, ping pong, and air hockey tables, ample couch and student meeting areas. The center has eight different dining options including Starbucks, Chick-fil-A, and Subway. It also houses the Student Credit Union, the Campus Bookstore and USPS Post Office.

The University Center for Human Performance features indoor basketball courts, four racquetball courts, an indoor elevated jogging track, an indoor rock-climbing gym, hardwood floor multipurpose rooms for fitness/aerobic classes, locker rooms and shower facilities for student use, an indoor pool and a state-of-the-art two-story gym with large windows facing out towards the university mall.

Lake House
The off-campus Angelo State Lake House at nearby Lake Nasworthy offers many recreational opportunities for students. The Lake House provides lake and beach access, a basketball court,
playground, and sand volleyball courts, as well as canoes and kayaks for free student use. It also provides meeting and recreational rooms and cooking facilities for students, faculty, and student organizations.

Student housing
The University provides on-campus housing for over 2,500 students. Over 25% of the student body resides on campus. The university's housing was ranked fifth in the nation on a list of "Most Inviting Yet Affordable College Dorms in America" by AffordableSchools.net, a higher-education resource website. All units provide individually controlled air-conditioning units, phone and cable television service, data connections, and access to the university Wi-Fi network. Rent includes all utilities. The seven residential facilities on campus have options that range from traditional dormitory units to those that offer private bedroom suites with a common living area and kitchenette. All halls have resident assistants who live in the building to assist students.

Student media
The university operates Ram TV, available locally in San Angelo on SuddenLink cable channel 6. The channel operates 24 hours a day, featuring new original programming Monday through Thursday during prime time. The Ram Page is the university's official weekly published student-run newspaper. The Ramdiculous Page is a satirical newspaper independently produced on campus by Angelo State students. Ram Radio is an Internet station broadcasting 24 hours a day. Angelo State will also soon contribute news reports to the newly acquired local NPR station KNCH. Students may access ASU news information on their iPhones with the new release of the ASU Mobile app. All student media offices and studios are located on the third floor of the library.

Intramural and club sports

Around 21% of students are involved in some kind of intramural sport at Angelo State. Intramural sports available include flag football, table tennis, badminton, volleyball, soccer, ultimate Frisbee, kickball, basketball, racquetball, tennis, disc golf, volleyball, softball, and golf. Angelo State club sports include rodeo, rugby, ultimate Frisbee, bass fishing, handball, racquetball, and powerlifting. Teams range from noncompetitive fun teams to competitive intercollegiate teams.

ASU has extensive facilities available for intramural athletics. ASU's intramural complex has over 235,000 square feet of artificial Hellas Turf broken into three 7-on-7 flag football fields, four 4-on-4 flag football fields, two softball fields, two soccer fields and a rugby field. The field is fully lighted for night time use. Intramural basketball teams play in the recreational Center for Human Performance gym. Three racquetball courts are also located in the CHP. Angelo State's competitive flag football teams have won national championships in 2009, 2010, 2012 and 2013

Athletics

Angelo State athletic teams are the Rams. The university is a member of the Division II level of the National Collegiate Athletic Association (NCAA), primarily competing in the Lone Star Conference (LSC) since the 1968–69 academic year. Prior to becoming a four-year institution, the Rams previously competed in the National Junior College Athletic Association (NJCAA) until after the 1963–64 academic year.

Angelo State competes in 13 intercollegiate varsity sports: Men's sports include baseball, basketball, cross country, football and track & field; while women's sports include basketball, cross country, golf, soccer, softball, soccer, tennis, track & field and volleyball.

Attendance
Attendance and support of ASU athletics is high, in DII, attendance at ASU athletic games has ranked in the top 20 schools in the nation 15 times in the last 20 years.

Accomplishments
Men's basketball
 1957 Rams NJCAA National Championship

Football
 1978 Rams NAIA Division I National Championship

Softball
 2004 Rambelles NCAA Division II National Championship

Track & field
 2010 Rambelles NCAA Division II National Championship

Traditions

Homecoming

Homecoming is an historic ritual jointly run by the Alumni Association, the university, and the students. Activities include a pep rally followed by a torch parade to light the bonfire, a homecoming through downtown San Angelo, and the football game. The crowning of the Homecoming Queen and King is held during the game's halftime. Throughout the week leading up to the game, student organizations compete for the Spirit Stick, given to the group which has shown the most spirit and contributed the most to the many tasks required to make the event a success. Since 1975, Angelo State University's Air Force ROTC Detachment 847 has built the bonfire. It is also a tradition to soapsuds the fountain outside Stephens Arena. For alumni, they hold the annual Alumni Awards Banquet, honoring distinguished alumni and university donors.

Ram Jam

The official Ram Jam was started by the Alumni Association in 2003 and has grown to become the large pregame football tailgating parties they are today. During the fall semester outside the LeGrand Alumni Center, students, alumni, and community members park their cars in the parking lot and hang out around the center to grill and socialize. The events also feature local bands to provide entertainment, free food and refreshments, bounce houses and other games for kids, and alcoholic beverages for those 21 and up. The Ram Band, the ASU dance team, the Angelettes, and the ASU Cheerleaders also perform and everyone walks over to the stadium prior to the game.

Ram’s Head
The Ram's Head sign is made by bending the middle and ring fingers down over the palm and covering them with the thumb. The extended index and pinky fingers are then bent halfway to represent the curve of the horns. The sign is used at various times during athletic events and typically during the playing of the alma mater.

Ring ceremony
Prior to each commencement, the ASU Alumni Association hosts a ring ceremony where the university president presents class rings to recipients. Appearing at each ceremony is ASU's mascot, Dominic. After receiving their rings, recipients touch their rings to Dominic's horns for strength, or rub them through his wool for luck. Though Angelo State rings have existed since the beginning of the university, a new official ASU ring was introduced by the ASU Alumni Society in 2003. The top of the Angelo State class ring presents the ASU seal. One side of the ring shows the State of Texas with a star marking San Angelo; below that is an oak branch. On the other side is an image of the mascot, Dominic.

Mascots

A purebred Rambouillet ram, Dominic, stands as a symbol of Angelo State University and the institution's ties to the region and its people. The first Rambouillet ram, named "Shorty", was donated to the college in 1940 by area rancher D.T. Jones, who had two daughters attending the school at the time.

Angelo State's ram went by a variety of names until 1964, when the student body held an election to decide on a permanent moniker, and "Dominic" won out. Today, Dominic is a regular fixture at ASU activities, ranging from the ring ceremony to outdoor athletic events. He is typically kept close to the end zone at Angelo State football games.

Two costumed mascots, Roscoe and Bella, appear at most athletic events and many community activities, where they lead cheers and interact with students and fans. Roscoe has appeared at many games since the 1960s courtesy of the Pi Kappa Alpha fraternity, one of the oldest and most active fraternities on the ASU campus. Bella made her debut in October 2010, supported by the Delta Zeta she appears with Roscoe and the ASU cheerleaders at most athletic and student-body events. Both students portraying the mascots are sworn to everlasting secrecy to retain the Ram legacy.

Notable people

Angelo State University has a large and active alumni base. A common indicator of university stature is set by past graduates' success. Angelo State University alumni have gone on to succeed in professions on the state and national levels. They include major executives at Fortune 500 companies, Emmy award-nominated actors, Grammy Award-winning musicians, Super Bowl winners, authors of number-one books The New York Times bestseller list, Texas Supreme Court justices, Texas state representatives and senators, and United States congressmen.

References

External links

 
 Official athletics website

 
Educational institutions established in 1928
Buildings and structures in San Angelo, Texas
Universities and colleges accredited by the Southern Association of Colleges and Schools
Public universities and colleges in Texas
Education in Tom Green County, Texas
1928 establishments in Texas